Žemyna (also Žemynėlė or Žemelė) (from  – earth) is the goddess of the earth in Lithuanian religion. She is usually regarded as mother goddess and one of the chief Lithuanian gods similar to Latvian Zemes māte. Žemyna personifies the fertile earth and nourishes all life on earth, human, plant, and animal. All that is born of earth will return to earth, thus her cult is also related to death. As the cult diminished after baptism of Lithuania, Žemyna's image and functions became influenced by the cult of Virgin Mary.

Name 
Žemyna stems from the name of Proto-Indo-European Earth-goddess *Dʰéǵʰōm. It relates to Thracian Zemele ('mother earth') and Greek Semelē.

Role 
Žemyna was first mentioned by Jan Łasicki (1582). It was later also described by Mikalojus Daukša (1595), Daniel Klein (1653), Matthäus Prätorius, Jacob Brodowski (1740), and in numerous folk legends, beliefs, and prayers.  Prätorius described a ritual, called žemyneliauti, performed at major celebrations (e.g. weddings) or agricultural works (e.g. harvest). The head of the household would drink a cup of beer, but first, he would spill some of the drink on the ground and say a short prayer. Then he would kill a rooster or a hen, which would be cooked and eaten by the entire family. Each family member would receive a loaf of bread and say prayers, blessings, and greetings. The bones and other scraps would be sacrificed to the goddess (burned or buried). Other recorded rites included burying bread baked from last crops of prior harvest in a field before new sowing and sacrifice of a black piglet. People would also kiss the earth saying a short prayer thanking Žemyna for all her gifts and acknowledging that one day they will return to her. People addressed Žemyna in various affectionate diminutive names and epithets.

In addition, historical sources on Baltic mythology describe the dual role of goddess Zemyna: while she was connected to the fertility of the land, she was also associated with receiving the dead and acting as their ruler and guardian. Pieces of Lithuanian folklore also make references to Earth as mother of humans and their final abode after death.

Family
The goddess is said to be married to either Perkūnas (thunder god) or Praamžius (manifestation of chief heavenly god Dievas). Thus the couple formed the typical Indo-European pair of mother-earth and father-sky. It was believed that the earth needs to be fertilized by the heavens (rain and thunder). Thus it was prohibited to plow or sow before the first thunder as the earth would be barren.

In modern culture
The Lithuanian folk music group Kūlgrinda in collaboration with Donis released an album in 2013 titled Giesmės Žemynai, meaning "Hymns to Žemyna".

Related male deities
Other characters in Lithuanian mythology are related - etymologically or semantically - to goddess Zemyna and a cult of the earth, such as  Žemėpatis ('Earth Spouse') and Žemininkas, male deities associated with cattle, agriculture and the fertility of the land. Their names are present in historical records of the Lithuanian non-Christian faith by foreign missionaries.

Another male divinity with the name Zemeluks, Zamoluksei, Zameluks or Ziameluks is also said to be attested. An account tells he is a DEUS TERRAE ('earth god'), while in other he is "a lord or god of earth who was buried in the earth" by the Prussians.

Footnotes

See also
 Zam
 Proto-Indo-European mythology
 Indo-European cosmogony
 Baltic mythology
 Prussian mythology
 Lithuanian mythology
 Semele

References

Further reading
 Dundulienė, Pranė (1976). "Žemė lietuvių tikėjimuose ir liaudies mene. In: Istorija 16.1: 129-153.
 Laurinkienė, Nijolė. Žemyna ir jos mitinis pasaulis [Žemyna and her mythical world]. Vilnius: Lietuvių literatūros ir tautosakos institutas, 2013. 

Agricultural goddesses
Lithuanian goddesses
Earth goddesses